Camas Cemetery is a cemetery in Camas, Washington that was first used in 1860.

The Camas Catholic Cemetery, also known as Dead Lake Cemetery, was located on NE Lake road near Lacamas Lake.  In 1984 the graves from there were moved to the new Camas Cemetery and a monument stands now with the names of those moved.

Sources

External links
 

 

Camas, Washington
Cemeteries in Washington (state)
Protected areas of Clark County, Washington